Sergei Vladimirovich Bryzgalov (born 15 November 1992) is a Russian footballer. He plays as a centre-back for FC Fakel Voronezh.

Club career
He made his debut in the Russian Premier League on 28 March 2010 for FC Saturn Moscow Oblast in a game against FC Rostov.

Career statistics

Club

External links

References

1992 births
People from Pavlovo, Nizhny Novgorod Oblast
Sportspeople from Nizhny Novgorod Oblast
Living people
Russian footballers
Russia youth international footballers
Russia under-21 international footballers
Association football fullbacks
FC Saturn Ramenskoye players
FC Spartak Moscow players
FC Spartak-2 Moscow players
FC Akhmat Grozny players
FC Anzhi Makhachkala players
FC Ural Yekaterinburg players
FC Fakel Voronezh players
Russian Premier League players
Russian Second League players
Russian First League players